Noyes is a surname.

Noyes may also refer to:


Given name
 Noyes Barber (1781–1844), American politician
 Noyes Billings (1800–1865), American politician, 39th Lieutenant Governor of Connecticut
 Noyes L. Jackson (1860–1933), American politician, businessman and farmer
 Noyes Leech (1921–2010), American lawyer and law professor

Places

United States
 Noyes, Minnesota, a town
 Noyes Township, Clinton County, Pennsylvania
 Noyes Island, Alexander Archipelago, Alaska
 Noyes Mountain (Maine)
 Mount Noyes (Washington)
 Noyes Mountain, a summit of the Mentasta Mountains in Alaska

Canada
 Mount Noyes, Alberta

Other uses
 Noyes Academy, an abolitionist school in Canaan, New Hampshire, United States
 Noyes Building, the administration building of Snow College, Ephraim, Utah, United States, on the National Register of Historic Places
 Noyes Museum, an art museum in New Jersey, United States
 Noyes Records, a Canadian record label
 Noyes station, a rapid transit station in Chicago, Illinois, United States
 Noyes Laboratory of Chemistry, University of Illinois Urbana-Champaign
 Noye, protagonist of Noye's Fludde, an opera by Benjamin Britten

See also
 Noyes House (disambiguation)
 Noyes Cottage, Harrietstown, New York, United States, on the National Register of Historic Places
 Noye (disambiguation)

English-language masculine given names